The Cerrito Government governed almost all the Uruguayan territory during the Great Siege of Montevideo (1843-1851). It was led by Manuel Oribe y Viana.

Uruguay was experiencing the Guerra Grande, between the two traditional parties Colorado and Blanco. Oribe sieged the city during 9 years; his headquarters were established at the present neighbourhood of Cerrito de la Victoria. Other notable posts were Villa Restauración (with tribunal and university) and Buceo (with its harbor).

See also
 Gobierno de la Defensa
 Great Siege of Montevideo
 Uruguayan Civil War

References

External links

Uruguayan Civil War
History of Montevideo
National Party (Uruguay)
Unión, Montevideo